The Foundations of Modern Political Thought is a two-volume work of intellectual history by Quentin Skinner, published in 1978. The work traces the conceptual origins of modern politics by investigating the history of political thought in the West at the turn of the medieval and early modern periods, from the 13th to the 16th centuries. It represents the contextualist approach to the history of ideas which Skinner and his colleagues in the Cambridge School had pioneered in the 1960s.

The Times Literary Supplement named the Foundations one of the 100 most influential books since World War II. An edited collection discussing and critiquing the work, Rethinking the Foundations of Modern Political Thought, was published in 2006.

References

Bibliography

1978 non-fiction books
Cambridge University Press books
History books about politics
History books about the Middle Ages
Works about the history of political thought
Medieval politics
Early Modern politics